Dimitar Ganchev was a Bulgarian revolutionary, anarchist and a member of the Internal Macedonian-Adrianople Revolutionary Organization (IMARO).

Dimitar Ganchev was born in 1875 in the town of Ruse, Ottoman Empire. After he graduated from the high-school in Ruse, he studied natural sciences at the University of Geneva, Switzerland. In 1897 he became a member of the so-called Geneva group – an anarchistic revolutionary circle led by Mihail Gerdzhikov and Petar Mandzhukov. With the assistance of his close friend Gotse Delchev, in 1901 Dimitar Ganchev was successfully hired as a teacher at the Bulgarian Pedagogical School in Skopie. In this city, he became a member of the IMARO and in 1902 he was chosen a member of the Skopie district revolutionary committee. Furthermore, in the beginning 1903 he was a delegate to the Solun congress, where a decision was made for an armed uprising. Dimitar Ganchev was against precipitate actions, but in the end he too signed the decision. During the Ilinden-Preobrazhenie Uprising, Dimitar Ganchev was in Skopie. In September 1903, after the Solun affair, he was arrested and sentenced to jail for 101 years. However, in 1904 he was released from prison, as he came under an amnesty procured by the Bulgarian government.

After his extradition to Bulgaria, he became a teacher in Razgrad, Bulgaria.

With the outbreak of the first Balkan War, Dimitar Ganchev enlisted in the Bulgarian Army as a volunteer. On October 17, 1912 he died on the battlefield by Bunarhisar.

References 

1875 births
1912 deaths
People from Ruse, Bulgaria
Bulgarian revolutionaries
Bulgarian educators
Members of the Internal Macedonian Revolutionary Organization
Bulgarian military personnel of the Balkan Wars
Bulgarian military personnel killed in action
Balkan Wars casualties
Revolutionaries from the Ottoman Empire
Bulgarian anarchists